June is a 2019 Indian Malayalam-language coming-of-age-romantic comedy film co-written and directed by Ahammed Khabeer. The film stars Rajisha Vijayan, Sarjano Khalid, Arjun Ashokan, Joju George, Aswathi Menon and Sunny Wayne. Produced by Vijay Babu through his production company Friday Film House.

The film also features 15 new comers as their debut acting.

Plot
The movie starts with June walking to a beach pub in Varkala town to have a drink. The scene shifts to the past where June Sarah Joy who is the only child of her parents Panama Joy and Mini Joy  is getting ready for the first day of her XI class. She wants to look chic but her mom is pretty strict though loving. Her father gives her advice that it is a turning point in her life and need to study hard.

It rains when she got into the school and she sees a handsome boy Noel taking video of the students. He comes to her and asks where the XI class room is. Both of them belong to the same class and she takes him to the classroom. Most of her friends are from the old class except for a few new students. When the teacher asks the students to perform a self introduction all students do it well except for Noel and June. Noel was recording the whole introduction session on his handcam and later tells June of his aspiration to be a filmmaker some day. The class teacher appoints Noel and June as the class leaders because she wants them to be smarter. Noel and June start to like each other. We get familiarised with June over the time and we see she is a happy-go-lucky girl with a creative streak. Meanwhile the school youth festival happens, the commerce department wins the championship due to the right plan by Noel. As time progresses, June makes new friends and the whole class bonds together, and her Plus Two batch of 2007 is finally able to become a batch to remember not just for the students, but also for the teachers. Noel, her newfound best friend is now elevated to the level of her boyfriend. They get to connect well with each other as they are both considered to be lagging with their talents. Towards the end of Plus two, when June's mother find out about Noel, she decides to end their relationship. She joins a nearby college while he travels to Mumbai to stay with his parents and to continue his studies. She spends her college life in misery, after which she goes to Mumbai, gets a job and stays there with a friend and finds and meets Noel and they start dating. But they breakup after a while because of his arrogant father and his attachment to him. Heartbroken, June returns to Kerala and goes to the pub in Varkala shown in the beginning. There she hits a guy for harassment and ends up in the police station where she meets Anand, a guy from a nearby school which she was in. He takes her home for breakfast and later drops her to the bus stand. On the way he explains how he liked her for years. He ends up accompanying her till her home bus stop. They bond over the journey. It is implied that they date and eventually breakup. The film ends with June becoming an event management company owner and entrepreneur, and choosing to marry Alex whom she meets through her parents and feels an instant connect with, and her friends from schooltime, including Noel and Anand, coming together to celebrate her wedding reception.

The movie also traces the friendship, love, aspirations and lives of June's classmates as well, through various stages.

Cast

Rajisha Vijayan as June Sara Joy, Noel's and Anand's love interest, Alex's Wife
Sarjano Khalid as Noel, June's 1st love interest
Arjun Ashokan as Anand, June's 2nd love interest
Joju George as 'Panama' Joy, June's father 
Aswathi Menon as Mini Joy, June's mother
Sunny Wayne as Alex, June's Husband
Vaishnavi Venugopal as Abhirami Narayanan ("Abi") / Mottachi, June and Noel's best friend 
Aju Varghese as Binoi Varkkala, the man at Varkkala pub
Nayana Elza as Kunji, June's best friend
Jishnu Sathyan as Antony / Bruce Lee, Kunji's husband
Fahim Safar as Sankar Das / Harry Pottan, June and Noel's best friend
Sanju K. S. as Arjun 
Akhil Manoj as Suraj
Harisankar as Rahul
Sruthy Suresh as Sreelakshmi
Margret Antony as Ann Mary
Raveena Nair as Fida
Sruthy Jayan as Maya teacher
Shiny T Rajan as Anand's mother
Manoj Kumar as Alex's father
Jolly Chirayath as Alex's mother

Kalesh Kalakkodu as  Kalesh Binoi Varkkala's Friend,

Production
June marks the directorial debut of Ahammed Khabeer. The film was shot in reverse order of the screenplay from the end to the beginning, allowing actors to undergo physical changes to look younger, along with filming. Rajisha Vijayan lost  and cut her long hair for portraying teenage June. The film was shot mostly in Pathanamthitta, Varkala, Mumbai and Kottayam. The school scenes were shot in Believers Church Residential School, Thiruvalla and Catholicate College,Pathanamthitta.

Soundtrack 

The film's soundtrack was composed by Ifthi.

Reception

Critical response
Anna Mathews from The Times of India said, "Debut director Ahammed Khabeer goes all out to jog the viewers’ memories of the best of school days when you are in a rush to grow up and he does a good job of it. ‘June’ will appeal to the wide demographic of pre-teens, teens and all those who were teens".
A critic from The Hindu wrote, "The film is a winner for its earnestness, its non-judgmental approach towards the female".

Box office

The film was a commercial success and completed 100 days theatrical run.

References

External links
 

2010s Malayalam-language films
Indian coming-of-age comedy films
Films shot in Mumbai
Films shot in Thiruvananthapuram
2010s coming-of-age comedy films